An AFm phase is an "alumina, ferric oxide, monosubstituted" phase, or aluminate ferrite monosubstituted, or ,  mono, in cement chemist notation (CCN). AFm phases are important hydration products in the hydration of hydraulic cements.

They are crystalline hydrates with generic, simplified, formula , where:
 CaO,  represent calcium oxide, aluminium oxide, and ferric oxide, respectively; 
 CaX represents a calcium salt, where X replaces an oxide ion;
 X is the substituted anion in CaX: – divalent  (…) with y = 1, or;– monovalent (…) with y = 2. 
 n represents the number of  water molecules in the hydrate and may be comprised between 13 and 19.

AFm form inter alia when tricalcium aluminate  in CCN, reacts with dissolved calcium sulfate or calcium carbonate . As the sulfate form is the dominant one in AFm phases, it is often referred to as Aluminate Ferrite monosulfate or calcium aluminate monosulfate. However, carbonate-AFm phases also exist: monocarbonate and hemicarbonate.

See also
 Concrete degradation#Chloride attack
 Layered double hydroxides (LDH)
 Friedel's salt
 Ettringite (AFt)
 Pitting corrosion of rebar induced by chloride attack

References

Further reading

 
 
 
 
 

Aluminium compounds
Cement
Concrete
Hydrates
Iron compounds
Iron(III) compounds
Silicates
Sulfate minerals
Sulfates